Viera Mikulášiková (born 4 September 1981) is a former Slovakian Paralympic swimmer who competed in international level events. She has an impaired left leg due to blood poisoning a few days after she was born which led to her having no left femur.

References

1981 births
Living people
Sportspeople from Bratislava
Swimmers at the 2000 Summer Paralympics
Swimmers at the 2004 Summer Paralympics
Swimmers at the 2008 Summer Paralympics
Medalists at the 2004 Summer Paralympics
Paralympic medalists in swimming
Paralympic silver medalists for Slovakia
Paralympic swimmers of Slovakia
Slovak female freestyle swimmers
Medalists at the World Para Swimming Championships
S10-classified Paralympic swimmers